Whitton Ward is a ward in the North West Area of Ipswich, Suffolk, England. It returns three councillors to Ipswich Borough Council.

It is designated Middle Layer Super Output Area Ipswich 001 by the Office of National Statistics. It is composed of 5 Lower Layer Super Output Areas.

Ward profile, 2008
Whitton Ward is located at the north western edge of Ipswich. In 2005 it had a population of almost 8,000. The area has more than the Ipswich average number of households with children.

References

 
Wards of Ipswich